Florea Ispir (born 25 November 1949 in Vârteju, Ilfov County) is a Romanian football player and coach. As a player, his total of 485 appearances in Liga I for ASA Târgu Mureş place him third in the all-time list, behind Ionel Dănciulescu with 515 and Costică Ştefănescu with 490, also those 485 appearances place him first in the Liga I matches played for a single team. The Romanian Football Federation awarded him the Order of Merit with Diamonds for his lifetime achievement.

Honours

Player
ASA Târgu Mureş
Liga I runner-up: 1974–75
Liga II: 1970–71, 1986–87

Notes

References

External links

1949 births
Living people
Romanian footballers
Liga I players
Liga II players
FC Steaua București players
ASA Târgu Mureș (1962) players
Romanian football managers
CS Gaz Metan Mediaș managers
CSM Unirea Alba Iulia managers
Association football central defenders
People from Ilfov County